Passantino is a surname. Notable people with the surname include:

 George Passantino (1922–2004), American artist, teacher, and author
 Robert Passantino (1951–2003), American Christian author and journalist 

Surnames of Italian origin